

Hermann Kreß (23 July 1895 – 11 August 1943) was a German Generalleutnant during World War II who commanded the 4th Mountain Division.

In 1938 Kreß was appointed to command the 1st Mountain Division's 99th Regiment. He led the regiment until 1943, receiving the Knight's Cross of the Iron Cross in December 1941 while serving on the Eastern Front. After heavy losses to the 1st Mountain Division, he was given command of the 4th Mountain Division which he led as part of the XXXXIX Mountain Corps in the Battle of the Caucasus. Kreß was killed by a Soviet sniper on 11 August 1943, near Novorossiysk on the Kuban bridgehead.

Awards 

 Knight's Cross of the Iron Cross on 20 December 1941 as Oberst (colonel) and commander of Gebirgsjäger-Regiment 99

References

Citations

Bibliography

1895 births
1943 deaths
People from Haßfurt
People from the Kingdom of Bavaria
German Army personnel of World War I
Military personnel from Bavaria
Recipients of the clasp to the Iron Cross, 1st class
Recipients of the Knight's Cross of the Iron Cross
German Army personnel killed in World War II
Lieutenant generals of the German Army (Wehrmacht)
Deaths by firearm in the Soviet Union
Deaths by firearm in Russia
German Army generals of World War II